Palmolive may refer to:
 Colgate-Palmolive, the company associated with Palmolive brand soap 
 Palmolive (brand), a soap brand owned by Colgate-Palmolive
 Palmolive (musician) or Paloma Romero (born 1955), Spanish-born drummer